Pseudoeurycea jaguar, or the jaguar salamander, is a species of salamander in the family Plethodontidae. It is endemic to Veracruz, Mexico.

Habitat
Its natural habitat is subtropical or tropical dry forests of the Sierra de Zongolica in Veracruz. At its type locality, it was found in Cupressus forests.

Phylogenetics
It is genetically most similar to Pseudoeurycea ruficauda from the Sierra Mazateca of northern Oaxaca, southern Mexico. Both species belong to the Pseudoeurycea juarezi group, which also includes P. saltator and P. aurantia.

References

jaguar
Endemic amphibians of Mexico
Fauna of the Sierra Madre de Oaxaca
Amphibians described in 2022